Nam Hao or Huai Nam Hao is a watercourse of Thailand. It joins the Nan River near Ban Aham in Nan Province.

An ancient castle moat in Nantong, China is also referred to as the Hao River. 

Hao